The 2017–18 Jordan League Division 1 started on 26 February 2018 and is scheduled to conclude on 15 May 2018.

The league featured 10 teams from the 2016–17 campaign, two new teams relegated from the 2016–17 Premier League: Al-Sareeh and Sahab, and two new teams promoted from the 2016–17 Jordan League Division 2: Dar Al-Dawa and Shabab Al-Hussein.

Al-Salt won the league title and promoted to 2018–19 Jordan League along with Al-Sareeh. Al-Asalah and Al-Jalil were relegated to the 2017–18 Jordan League Division 2.

Teams
A total of 14 teams are contesting the league, including 10 sides from the 2016–17 season, two relegated from the 2016–17 Premier League, and two promoted from the 2016–17 Jordan League Division 2.

Team changes
The following teams have changed division since the 2016–17 season.

To Division 1 
Promoted from 2016–17 Division 2
 Dar Al-Dawa
 Shabab Al-Hussein

Relegated from 2016–17 Premier League
 Al-Sareeh
 Sahab

Stadia and locations

Table as of 2017–18 Season:

League table

Notes

References

Jordan
2017–18 in Jordanian football